Grenville Archer Lansdell, Jr. (July 16, 1918 – May 14, 1984) was an American football halfback who played for the National Football League's (NFL) New York Giants during the 1940 season.

Prior to his NFL career, Lansdell played college football at the University of Southern California (USC), filling multiple roles. His official position in college was quarterback, but he served as a running back, while also throwing passes and punting. The Daily Pilot described Lansdell as "one of the last of the truly great all-around triple-threat stars in college football history". In addition, Lansdell was a punt returner and played safety on defense. Offensively, he led USC in passing yards from 1937 to 1939, and in rushing yards in 1938 and 1939; USC reached the Rose Bowl in both seasons. The 1939 Trojans were recognized as national champions by the Dickinson System.

Lansdell appeared in USC's season opener in 1937 against Pacific as a replacement for an injured player, throwing for two touchdowns; later in the year, he had 117 yards rushing in a 12–12 tie with Oregon State. His 1938 performances included a punt return for a touchdown against Ohio State, a touchdown in a USC win over third-ranked California, and another punt return touchdown in a loss to Washington. In 1939, he ran for 101 yards and scored two touchdowns in a 20–12 USC win over Notre Dame, and one week later threw a game-winning touchdown pass against Washington. In the 1940 Rose Bowl, which concluded the Trojans' 1939 season, Lansdell contributed 51 rushing yards in a 14–0 victory over Tennessee.

In the 1940 NFL Draft, the Giants chose Lansdell with the 10th overall pick. He played one season for the team, appearing in two games and rushing for nine yards in seven attempts; he also completed two passes in three attempts. Lansdell's football career was interrupted in 1941, when he joined the U.S. Army. During World War II, Lansdell was a pilot with the Army Air Corps. Lansdell did not return to football following the war; instead, he piloted flights for Trans World Airlines for more than 30 years.

References

External links
 NFL.com profile

1918 births
1984 deaths
American football halfbacks
American football quarterbacks
Canadian players of American football
New York Giants players
Players of American football from Pasadena, California
Sportspeople from Victoria, British Columbia
United States Army Air Forces pilots of World War II
USC Trojans football players